Chaba Peak is located on the border of Alberta and British Columbia. It was named in 1920 by the Interprovincial Boundary Survey. Chaba is the Stoney Indian word for beaver.

See also
List of peaks on the Alberta–British Columbia border

References

Three-thousanders of Alberta
Three-thousanders of British Columbia
Canadian Rockies